In railroad slang, an engineer.
 In motorcycling, a trade name for helmet visors which don't fog.
 In meteorology, "A white bow in the clouds during foggy weather is so called.  Such a bow was seen in England during January, 1888.  A week preceding, the weather had been clear, sunshiny, and genial, then followed several days of thick fog, during which the white bow appeared.  The bow was followed by several days of brilliant mild weather." Source: Brewer's Dictionary.
It appears that the ring grows as the fog lightens and suddenly vanishes as if a huge mouth had swallowed the fog.
 Bio Stim KB4 “The Fog Eater” is an industrial product promoting growth of bacteria that remove FOG - Fats Oils and Grease.

Not to be confused with Fog-Breather – US slang for a British person.